Vengeance Descending may refer to:

 Vengeance Descending (Crystal Eyes album), 2003
 Vengeance Descending (Nightrage album), 2010